Janan Ganesh (born 18 February 1982) is a British journalist, author and political commentator. Ganesh is the principal political columnist for the Financial Times and regularly appeared on the BBC show Sunday Politics.

Career
Ganesh attended Stanley Technical School for Boys, a voluntary aided school in South London; afterward, he studied Politics at Warwick University; he then studied Public Policy at University College London.

Ganesh was active in Labour Students, the student wing of the Labour Party, having been inspired to join when he was 17 by Tony Blair's 1999 annual Labour Party Conference speech. In an interview with The Guardian at the time Ganesh described himself as "essentially a Portillista", comparing his politics to Michael Portillo's, who was the then Conservative Party Shadow Chancellor. Ganesh opted not to attend his local constituency Labour Party meetings as they were "too dominated by Trots".

For two years he was a Researcher at the Policy Exchange, a Westminster-based think tank on the political right set up by Conservative MPs Nick Boles, Michael Gove and Francis Maude, and for five years he was political correspondent for The Economist. Ganesh co-authored Compassionate Conservatism (2006) with Jesse Norman, which received the T. E. Utley Memorial Prize for young journalists.

Ganesh has written George Osborne: The Austerity Chancellor (2012), a biography of British Chancellor of the Exchequer, George Osborne.

Ganesh has written columns about British politics for the Financial Times, and in early 2018 announced plans to relocate to Washington D.C. in June to write about American politics for the same publication.

References

1982 births
Living people
English journalists
English columnists
British commentators
21st-century English writers
Alumni of University College London
Alumni of the University of Warwick